Ivan Berezun (born 19 August 1997) is a Belarusian professional footballer who plays for Orsha.

References

External links 
 
 

1997 births
Living people
Sportspeople from Vitebsk
Belarusian footballers
Association football midfielders
FC Vitebsk players
FC Orsha players